Charles Frank (born 1947) is an American actor.

Charles Frank may also refer to:

Frederick Charles Frank (1911–1998), known as Sir Charles Frank, British theoretical physicist
Charles Frank Ltd, an optical and scientific instrument maker in Glasgow, Scotland
Charles Frank (instrument maker) (1865–?), optical and scientific instrument maker from Glasgow, Scotland

See also
Charlie Frank (1891–1961), South African cricketer
Charlie Frank (baseball) (1870–1922), Major League Baseball player
Charles Franks, founder of Distributed Proofreaders